Walton Sanders Goggins Jr. (born November 10, 1971) is an American actor. He has starred in a number of television series, including The Shield (2002–2008), Justified (2010–2015), Vice Principals (2016–2017), The Righteous Gemstones (2018–present) and The Unicorn (2020–2021). He has also starred in films, such as Predators (2010), Django Unchained (2012), The Hateful Eight (2015), as well as Maze Runner: The Death Cure, Tomb Raider, and Ant-Man and the Wasp (all 2018). He also voices Cecil Stedman in Amazon Prime's Invincible (2021–present). He was nominated for the Primetime Emmy Award for Outstanding Supporting Actor in a Drama Series for his work on Justified. Goggins starred in the short film The Accountant, which won the Academy Award for Best Live Action Short Film.

Early life
Goggins was born in Birmingham, Alabama, the son of Janet Long and Walton Sanders Goggins Sr. He was raised in Lithia Springs, Georgia, a suburb of Atlanta, and graduated from Lithia Springs High School and attended Georgia Southern University for a year.

Career

Goggins worked for a valet car parking service and various restaurants in Los Angeles. After starring in a few roles in Georgia, he met Ray McKinnon while filming Murder in Mississippi.

Goggins played Shane Vendrell in the FX series The Shield. He formed the production company Ginny Mule Pictures, which produced four films: The Accountant (a short film which won an Academy Award for Live Action Short Film), Chrystal (Sundance Dramatic Competition), Randy and the Mob and That Evening Sun (which won the South by Southwest Special Jury Prize). They later created the series Rectify. Goggins was set to play the lead and AMC had bought the pilot script, written by McKinnon, a role which went to Aden Young, when the series later went to SundanceTV.

Goggins played Boyd Crowder in the pilot episode for the FX series Justified, while filming a major supporting role as a deadly death row inmate being hunted by the titular antagonists in the film Predators. Boyd was intended to die in the pilot episode, but Graham Yost kept the character when test audiences selected Goggins for the role. Goggins joined the main cast from the second season in May 2010. In 2011, he appeared in "Code of the West", a commercial for Ram Truck's "Guts & Glory" campaign. He appeared in Cowboys & Aliens as Hunt, a bandit formerly in the employ of the protagonist. Goggins was nominated for a Primetime Emmy Award for Outstanding Supporting Actor in a Drama Series for his role on Justified. He played Billy Crash, a sadistic overseer and slave fighting trainer, in the western film Django Unchained.

Goggins played a transgender prostitute in the FX series Sons of Anarchy. He previously worked with the show's creator, Kurt Sutter, when the latter was a writer and executive producer on The Shield. The name "Venus Van Dam" is a play on the undercover name "Cletus Van Damme" used by The Shield character Shane Vendrell. He played Chris Mannix in The Hateful Eight and Lee Russell in the HBO series Vice Principals. The New York Times critic Mike Hale wrote, "Walton Goggins makes a habit of being the best thing about the television shows he’s in."

In 2018, Goggins played Lawrence in Maze Runner: The Death Cure, Mathias Vogel in Tomb Raider, and Sonny Burch in Ant-Man and the Wasp. He played the lead character in the CBS sitcom, The Unicorn. He starred in the comedy series The Righteous Gemstones. In 2020, Goggins voiced part of the real crime podcast Deep Cover: The Drug Wars.

Honors, awards and distinctions

Goggins has received a steady stream of recognition for his professional work. With McKinnon, Lisa Blount and Ginny Mule Pictures, he was recognized by the Spirit of Slamdance Award at the Slamdance Film Festival in 2001 for The Accountant, which went on to win the Academy Award for Best Live Action Short Film in 2002. Their film Chrystal appeared in the 2004 U.S. Dramatic Competition at the Sundance Film Festival, and the same trio were awarded the Spirit of Slamdance Award again for Randy and the Mob.

Goggins was nominated for a Television Critics Association Award for Individual Achievement in Drama in 2009 for his role as Detective Shane Vendrell in The Shield. In the same year, McKinnon, Goggins, Hal Holbrook and the rest of the principal cast of That Evening Sun, won the Special Jury Award for Best Ensemble Cast at the South by Southwest Film Festival competition.

In 2013, Goggins was nominated for the San Diego Film Critics Society Award for Best Performance by an Ensemble in Quentin Tarantino's western film Django Unchained.

For his work on Justified, Goggins received nominations for the Primetime Emmy Award for Outstanding Supporting Actor in a Drama Series in 2011, the Satellite Award for Best Supporting Actor – Series, Miniseries or Television Film in 2011, the TV Guide Award for Favorite Villain in 2013, the Online Film & Television Association's Television Award for Best Supporting Actor in a Drama Series in 2011 and 2014, and for the Critics' Choice Television Award for Best Supporting Actor in a Drama Series in 2011, 2013, 2014 and 2015.

For Sons of Anarchy, Goggins received nominations for the Online Film & Television Association's Television Award for Best Guest Actor in a Drama Series in 2013 and 2014, and for the Critics' Choice Television Award for Best Guest Performer in a Drama Series in 2014 and 2015.

Personal life
Goggins was married to Canadian resident Leanne Kaun, who owned a dog-walking business in Laurel Canyon, California, until her death by suicide on November 12, 2004. Goggins married filmmaker Nadia Conners in August 2011. They have a son.

Goggins showcases some of his photography on a blog, when he took a sabbatical and traveled across India. He is active in various nonprofit organizations that range from environmental to humanitarian work. He attended the Global Green USA events. He is a partner in a spirits company, Mulholland Distilling.

Filmography

Film

Television

Video games

Awards and nominations

References

External links

1971 births
Living people
20th-century American male actors
21st-century American male actors
American environmentalists
American male film actors
American male television actors
American male voice actors
Male actors from Birmingham, Alabama
Male actors from Georgia (U.S. state)
Male Western (genre) film actors
People from Lithia Springs, Georgia